, stylized as THE ORAL CIGARETTES is a four-member Japanese alternative rock band from Nara Prefecture, formed in July 2010. The band signed to A-Sketch in 2012 and have currently released five studio albums, two independent albums, one demo album, one compilation album, one extended play and eight singles. They are best known for performing the opening theme song of the anime Noragami Aragoto, .

Band members
Current members
  — lead vocals, guitar (2010–present)
  — bass, vocals (2010–present)
  — guitar (2010–present)
  — drums (2013–present)

Former members
 Take — drums (2010–2012)

Timeline

Discography

Studio albums

Independent albums

Compilation albums

Demo albums

Extended plays

Singles

Digital singles

Filmography

Video albums

Soundtrack appearances

Music videos

Awards and nominations

References

External links
 

Japanese alternative rock groups
Japanese rock music groups
Musical quartets
Musical groups established in 2010
2010 establishments in Japan
A-Sketch artists